This is a list of all United States Supreme Court cases from volume 515 of the United States Reports:

External links

1995 in United States case law